Ferraria crispa is a species of monocotyledonous flowering plant in the family Iridaceae. It is native to South Africa.

In Australia it is commonly referred to as black flag. It is also known as starfish lily.

Gallery

References

External links
Ferraria crispa Burm Florabase
 

Iridaceae
Endemic flora of South Africa
~
Garden plants of Southern Africa